The 1940–41 season was Chelsea Football Club's second season of wartime football during the Second World War. As the Football League and the FA Cup were suspended for the duration, the club instead competed in regional competitions. Records and statistics for these matches are considered unofficial. Due to the disruption of the war, many scheduled matches were not completed. Chelsea finished 21st in the 32-team Football League South.

Notes

References

External links
 Chelsea in the Second World War at chelseafc.com

1940-41
English football clubs 1940–41 season